Qailertetang is an Inuit goddess who cares for animals, fishers, and hunters and who controls the weather. She dwells with her companion Sedna at the bottom of the sea, in the company of seals, whales, and other sea creatures. Qailertetang is depicted as a "large woman of very heavy limbs". In rituals, she is served by a two-spirit male shaman "dressed in a woman's costume and wearing a mask made of seal-skin".

Sources

Animal goddesses
Inuit goddesses
Sky and weather goddesses
Tutelary deities